The boarfish (Capros aper) is a species of fish in the family Caproidae, the only known member of its genus. Its scientific name is from Greek κᾰ́προς (kapros) and Latin aper, both meaning "wild boar."

Description
Capros aper commonly reaches a length of about 13 cm in males, with a maximum length of about 30 cm. The weight reaches about 85 g. The female is larger than male. This fish has large eyes, a quite long snout, and a very protractile mouth that forms a short tube when extended.

The general form of the body can be defined as rhombic, quite deep, and compressed. The dorsal fin is unique, the caudal fin is rather large and spatulated with a convex edge, the ventral fins are very large and have a thorny spine, and the pectoral fins are quite small.

The color of the body is reddish orange, sometimes with three wide darker bands, one behind the eye, one in the center of the body, and one on the caudal peduncle. During the breeding season, sexual dimorphism is  striking; the male's body is covered with sinuous orange lines and the dorsal and ventral fins become red, while the female is orange with a faint dark band in the middle of the body and has belly and basal part of the ventral fins white silver, and the final part of the ventral fins is rather dark orange. It feeds on crustaceans, especially copepods and mysid shrimps, or on molluscs and worms.

Distribution
This species is widespread in the  Eastern Atlantic, from western Norway, Skagerrak, Shetland, and western Scotland to Senegal. It is also present in the Mediterranean, especially in the western part.

Habitat
Capros aper usually lives close to the floor of the sea (demersal), mainly on muddy bottoms or near rocky bottoms or coral. It forms numerous herds at a certain distance from the substrate, but occasionally it can reach a depth of about 700 m, especially at night.

References

 Joseph S. Nelson, Fishes of the World, John Wiley & Sons, 2006
 Costa F. Atlante dei pesci dei mari italiani Mursia 1991 
 Louisy P., Trainito E. Guida all'identificazione dei pesci marini d'Europa e del Mediterraneo. Milano, Il Castello, 2006.

External links

 Fishbase
 Taxonomicon
 Marine species identification
 Glaucus

Caproidae
Monotypic fish genera
Fish described in 1758
Fish of the Atlantic Ocean
Fish of Europe
Fish of the Mediterranean Sea
Taxa named by Carl Linnaeus